Tadeusz Browicz (15 September 1847 – 20 March 1928) was a Polish pathologist born in Lviv.

He studied medicine in Kraków, earning his medical doctorate in 1873. Afterwards he remained at Kraków as an assistant to the pathologist Alfred Biesiadecki (1839-1889), and in 1875 received his habilitation. From 1880 to 1919 he was a full professor of anatomical pathology at the Jagiellonian University, where in 1894-95 he served as its rector.

Browicz made several contributions to medical science. In 1874 he was the first to describe the bacillus that causes typhoid fever, later to be known as Salmonella typhi, and in 1898 was the first to correctly identify the liver's Kupffer cells as specialized macrophages. He also performed important research of jaundice, liver cancer and cardiac muscle disorders. Among his written works was the 1905 publication of a Polish medical dictionary.

References 

 This article is based on a translation of an article from the Polish Wikipedia.
 R. Szymańska, M. Schmidt-Pospuła: Z historii badań Tadeusza Browicza (1847–1928) i Karola Kupfera (1829–1902) nad komórkami siateczkowo-śródbłonkowymi wątroby. Archiwum Historii Medycyny 1979

External links 
 Komórki Browicza. 

1847 births
1928 deaths
Polish pathologists
Polish bacteriologists
Academic staff of Jagiellonian University
Jagiellonian University alumni
Rectors of the Jagiellonian University
Members of the Lwów Scientific Society
Physicians from Lviv